Crook and Willington was an urban district in County Durham, England from 1937 to 1974. It was created by a merger of the previous Crook and Willington urban districts, along with part of the disbanded Auckland Rural District.  It later formed part of the Wear Valley district. Today the population of this area is approximately 21,500.The area Includes Crook, Willington, Sunnybrow, Helmington Row, Billy Row and Roddymoor

References

Districts of England abolished by the Local Government Act 1972
History of County Durham
Urban districts of England